Indirect presidential elections were held in Brazil on 17 July 1934. Unlike previous elections which had been public (with the exception of the 1891 presidential election), this election was carried out by the Constituent Assembly. The result was a predictable victory for Getúlio Vargas, who received 175 of the 248 votes. The next elections did not take place until 1945, due to the Estado Novo dictatorship period.

Results

References

Presidential elections in Brazil
1934 in Brazil
Brazil
July 1934 events